Nine Bachelors (French:  Ils étaient neuf célibataires) is a 1939 French comedy film directed by Sacha Guitry and starring Guitry, Max Dearly and Elvire Popesco.

It was shot at the Joinville Studios in Paris and on location in the city. The film's sets were designed by the art director Jacques Colombier.

Synopsis
An opportunist dreams up a new scheme to make money when the French government passes a law forbidding foreigners from living in France.

Partial cast
 Sacha Guitry as Jean Lécuyer
 Max Dearly as Athanase Outriquet
 Elvire Popesco as Comtesse Stacia Batchefskaïa
 Victor Boucher as Alexandre
 Saturnin Fabre as Adhémar Colombinet de la Jonchère
 André Lefaur as Adolphe
 Raymond Aimos as Agénor
 Gaston Dubosc as Antonin Rousselier
 Marguerite Deval as Mme Picaillon de Chéniset
 Marguerite Moreno as Consuelo Rodriguez
 Marguerite Pierry as Isabelle Patureau
 Betty Stockfeld as Margaret Brown
 Pauline Carton as Clémentine

References

External links

1939 films
1939 comedy films
1930s French-language films
Films directed by Sacha Guitry
French black-and-white films
French comedy films
Films shot at Joinville Studios
1930s French films